Kiran Hospital is a hospital located in Katargam, Surat, India. The hospital was inaugurated by the Prime Minister of India  Shri Narendra Modi on 17 April 2017. Kiran hospital  is managed by Samast Patidar Aarogya Trust (SPAT).The  chairman of Kiran hospital is  Mr. Mathurbhai M. Savani.

Construction
The hospital was built on a  plot of land in Katargam area of Surat. The land for Hospital was allotted by the Municipal Corporation of Surat. The total cost to build the hospital was Rs 500 crore.

Naming of hospital
Kiran Gems's Vallabhbhai Patel donated Rs. 52 crores for the christening Kiran Hospital's name. Lavji Daliya, also known as Lavji Badshah donated Rs 11.11 crore for putting up the first brick of the building in his name. Savji Dholakia and Govind Laljibhai Dholakia donated Rs 1.2 crore and Rs 0.8 crore respectively for the construction of two floors each in the hospital.

References

External links
 

Hospitals in Surat
Hospitals in Gujarat
Healthcare in Gujarat
2017 establishments in Gujarat
Hospitals established in 2017